Robert Stephen Baird (born January 3, 1973) is a Canadian former competition swimmer who swam in the 1992 Summer Olympics in Barcelona, Spain.  There he finished in 16th position in the men's 400-metre individual medley.

References
Canadian Olympic Committee

1973 births
Living people
Canadian male medley swimmers
Canadian people of Scottish descent
Olympic swimmers of Canada
Swimmers from Ottawa
Swimmers at the 1992 Summer Olympics